Leonard Ames Farmhouse is a historic home located at Mexico in Oswego County, New York.  It is a large, Federal-style residence.  The first section is a small -story structure built about 1815.  It was enlarged by the addition of a large 2-story stone residence and with a -story wing built in 1835.

It was listed on the National Register of Historic Places in 1991.

References

Houses on the National Register of Historic Places in New York (state)
Federal architecture in New York (state)
Houses completed in 1815
Houses in Oswego County, New York
National Register of Historic Places in Oswego County, New York